Hayfork is a census-designated place (CDP) in Trinity County, California, United States.  Its population is 2,324 as of the 2020 census, down from 2,368 from the 2010 census.

Namesake
Hayfork was originally named Nor'el pom, a Wintu name meaning "south land". It was subsequently named Kingberry, then Haytown, and finally Hayfork after the nearby creek.

History
In 1921 the first Trinity County Fair was held with the Governor at the time William Stephens

Geography 
Hayfork is located at  (40.571406, -123.146619) at an elevation of 2310 feet.

Climate
This region experiences warm (but not hot) and dry summers, with no average monthly temperatures above 71.6 °F.  According to the Köppen Climate Classification system, Hayfork has a warm-summer Mediterranean climate, abbreviated "Csb" on climate maps. Hayfork experiences extreme diurnal temperature variation in summer, and also in winter the diurnals are wide enough to cause significant air frosts during night. Atypical for an area with such hot summertime temperatures and mild winters, frost usually occurs from mid September to early June, and frosts throughout the summer are not unheard of. There are an average of 69.8 days with a high over 90 degrees Fahrenheit, and 155 days that go below 32 degrees, including 1.7 days in June. On average, once every 10 years there will be a frost in July and 3 out of 10 years there will be one in August. Three times every ten years the temperature drops below zero. The same is true of having a daily high below 32 degrees: three in ten years. The town sees a mean of 2370.5 growing degree days with a base temperature of 50. Despite the USDA zone map showing the town in zone 8, NOAA records show that the town is actually in zone 7b, with the average coldest temperature experienced in a year being 6.8 degrees. The average hottest temperature in a year is 107.4 degrees. The record low high temperature is 30 degrees on 1/2 and 12/18 in 1924, and the record high low temperature is 64 degrees on reached five times: 7/19/2006, 7/22/2002, 7/26/1996, and 8/2 and 8/3 in 2003.

There are 80 days with precipitation of over 0.01 inches, 54 over 0.1 inches, 23 over 0.5 inches, and 9 over an inch. The record high monthly snowfall is 77.7 inches in January 1916, and traces of snowfall have been seen as late as 6/15 in 1950 and as early as 10/21 in 1961. Precipitation falls mostly as rain below 3300 feet and mostly as snow above that level, whereas Hayfork is at 2323 feet above sea level. The wettest "rain year" (July 1 to June 30) was 1982-83, with 72.69 inches of precipitation, and the driest was 1976-77 with 14.43 inches of precipitation.

Points of Interest
Japanese Bomb Balloon Marker. Erected in 1978, mentions the Japanese Bomb Balloon that exploded near the site in World War II.

Demographics

Population

2010
At the 2010 census Hayfork had a population of 2,368. The racial makeup of Hayfork was 1,999 (84.4%) White, 4 (0.2%) African American, 162 (6.8%) Native American, 8 (0.3%) Asian, 2 (0.1%) Pacific Islander, 38 (1.6%) from other races, and 155 (6.5%) from two or more races. Hispanic or Latino of any race were 189 people (8.0%).

The census reported that 2,326 people (98.2% of the population) lived in households, 42 (1.8%) lived in non-institutionalized group quarters, and no one was institutionalized.

There were 1,024 households, 247 (24.1%) had children under the age of 18 living in them, 424 (41.4%) were opposite-sex married couples living together, 107 (10.4%) had a female householder with no husband present, 62 (6.1%) had a male householder with no wife present. There were 109 (10.6%) unmarried opposite-sex partnerships, and 4 (0.4%) same-sex married couples or partnerships. 336 households (32.8%) were one person and 137 (13.4%) had someone living alone who was 65 or older. The average household size was 2.27. There were 593 families (57.9% of households); the average family size was 2.84.

The age distribution was 471 people (19.9%) under the age of 18, 160 people (6.8%) aged 18 to 24, 483 people (20.4%) aged 25 to 44, 810 people (34.2%) aged 45 to 64, and 444 people (18.8%) who were 65 or older.  The median age was 46.9 years. For every 100 females, there were 103.8 males.  For every 100 females age 18 and over, there were 109.6 males.

There were 1,213 housing units at an average density of 16.8 per square mile, of the occupied units 663 (64.7%) were owner-occupied and 361 (35.3%) were rented. The homeowner vacancy rate was 1.3%; the rental vacancy rate was 3.2%.  1,498 people (63.3% of the population) lived in owner-occupied housing units and 828 people (35.0%) lived in rental housing units.

2000
At the 2000 census there were 2,315 people, 964 households, and 618 families in the CDP.  The population density was 14.9 people per square mile (5.7/km).  There were 1,157 housing units at an average density of 7.4 per square mile (2.9/km).  The racial makeup of the CDP was 84.71% White, 0.13% African American, 8.34% Native American, 0.17% Asian, 0.39% from other races, and 6.26% from two or more races. Hispanic or Latino of any race were 4.92%.

Of the 964 households 27.9% had children under the age of 18 living with them, 48.3% were married couples living together, 11.7% had a female householder with no husband present, and 35.8% were non-families. 30.2% of households were one person and 11.8% were one person aged 65 or older.  The average household size was 2.40 and the average family size was 2.96.

The age distribution was 25.5% under the age of 18, 5.9% from 18 to 24, 24.1% from 25 to 44, 29.7% from 45 to 64, and 14.8% 65 or older.  The median age was 42 years. For every 100 females, there were 105.8 males.  For every 100 females age 18 and over, there were 99.5 males.

The median household income was $22,824 and the median family income  was $25,791. Males had a median income of $23,594 versus $29,306 for females. The per capita income for the CDP was $14,611.  About 17.8% of families and 23.7% of the population were below the poverty line, including 28.4% of those under age 18 and 8.8% of those age 65 or over.

School System 
Mountain Valley Unified School District (MVUSD) is a collection of six schools located in the Hayfork area, they are as follows. Hayfork High School, Hayfork Elementary School, Valley High School, Community Day School, Hyampom Arts Magnet School, and Adult Education School.

Politics

See also
Trinity County, California

References

Census-designated places in Trinity County, California
Census-designated places in California